Francis Ogola (born 1 July 1973 in Lira) is a retired Ugandan sprinter who specialized in the 400 metres.

His personal bests were 21.03 seconds over 200 metres (from 1995) and 45.47 s over 400 metres (from 1993).

Achievements

External links

1973 births
Living people
People from Lira District
Ugandan male sprinters
Athletes (track and field) at the 1992 Summer Olympics
Athletes (track and field) at the 1994 Commonwealth Games
Athletes (track and field) at the 1996 Summer Olympics
Olympic athletes of Uganda
Commonwealth Games competitors for Uganda
African Games bronze medalists for Uganda
African Games medalists in athletics (track and field)
Athletes (track and field) at the 1991 All-Africa Games